Calycobathra pakistanella is a moth in the family Cosmopterigidae. It was described by Kasy in 1968. It is found in western Pakistan and Afghanistan.

The wingspan is 8.5–10.5 mm. The forewings are yellowish-grey with a brownish-grey sprinkling. The hindwings are yellowish-grey. Adults have been recorded on wing in mid-May in Pakistan and mid-June in Afghanistan.

References

Natural History Museum Lepidoptera generic names catalog

Moths described in 1968
Chrysopeleiinae